Riquelme Carvalho Araújo Viana (born 28 April, 2002), better known as just Riquelme, is a Brazilian professional football player who plays as a left back for Vasco da Gama.

References

External links

2002 births
Living people
Brazilian footballers
Association football defenders
CR Vasco da Gama players
Campeonato Brasileiro Série B players
People from Barra Mansa